Molly Gloss (born November 20, 1944) is an American writer of historical fiction and science fiction.

Life
Gloss grew up in rural Oregon and began writing seriously when she became a mother. She now lives in Portland, Oregon, and was close friends with fellow science fiction writer Ursula K. Le Guin.  She has taught writing and literature of the American West at Portland State University, and served as visiting professor at Pacific University's low-residency MFA in Writing program.

Awards and nominations
 The Jump-Off Creek was a finalist for the PEN/Faulkner Award for Fiction and won both the 1990 Ken Kesey Award for the Novel and 1990 Pacific Northwest Booksellers Association Award
 1996 Whiting Award in Fiction
 Wild Life was a finalist for the Oregon Book Award and won the 2000 James Tiptree, Jr. Award for work that explores or expands notions of gender
 The Hearts of Horses was a finalist for the 2008 Oregon Book Award

Bibliography

Novels

Anthologies

Notable short fiction
 "Personal Silence", 1990 (reprinted in Year's Best Science Fiction 1991)
 "Lambing Season", 2002 (nominated for a Hugo Award for Best Short Story and a Nebula Award for Best Short Story)

References

External links
 mollygloss.com (official site)
 Review of The Dazzle of Day by Jo Walton
 
 
 Guide to the Molly Gloss papers at the University of Oregon.
 
Profile at The Whiting Foundation

1944 births
Living people
20th-century American novelists
21st-century American novelists
American science fiction writers
American women short story writers
American women novelists
Portland State University faculty
Writers from Portland, Oregon
Women science fiction and fantasy writers
20th-century American women writers
21st-century American women writers
20th-century American short story writers
21st-century American short story writers
PEN/Faulkner Award for Fiction winners
Novelists from Oregon
American women academics